The Lakandon Chʼol were a former Chʼol-speaking Maya people inhabiting the Lacandon Jungle in what is now Chiapas in Mexico and the bordering regions of northwestern Guatemala, along the tributaries of the upper Usumacinta River and the foothills of the Sierra de los Cuchumatanes.

The Lakandon Chʼol at contact with the Spanish
The Lakandon Chʼol of the time of the Spanish conquest should not be confused with the modern Yucatec-speaking Lacandon people occupying the same region. At the time of Spanish contact in the 16th century, the Lacandon Jungle was inhabited by Chʼol people referred to as Lakam Tun. This name was hispanicised, first to El Acantun, then to Lacantun and finally to Lacandon. The main Lakandon village was situated on an island in Lake Miramar, also referred to as Lakam Tun by the inhabitants. The Lakandons, together with their equally unconquered Itza enemies to the northeast, had an especially warlike reputation among the Spanish.

Later history

Hernán Cortés first heard of the existence of the Lakandon when he was passing through Kejache territory in 1524, although he did not actually contact them. During the 16th century, the Spanish colonial authorities in Verapaz, within the Captaincy General of Guatemala, complained that baptised Maya were fleeing colonial towns in order to find refuge among the independent Lakandon and their Manche Chʼol neighbours. The first Spanish expedition against the Lakandons was carried out in 1559, commanded by Pedro Ramírez de Quiñones.

At the end of the 16th century, under pressure from the advancing Spanish frontier, the Lakandon Chʼol abandoned Lakam Tun and withdrew deeper into the forest to the southeast where they founded a new town, Sakbʼajlan, within a wide curve of the Lacantún River. The name of the town translated as "white jaguar". The Lakandons had two other settlements further east, called Map and Peta.

During the course of the 17th century, the Lakandon Chʼol raided the Guatemalan Highlands to such an extent that it was considered unsafe to travel in the region surrounding San Mateo Ixtatán and Santa Eulalia in the Sierra de los Cuchumatanes, within the colonial Corregimiento de Totonicapán y Huehuetenango administrative division. In response, the colonial authorities placed garrisons in both towns in order to protect the local inhabitants against Lakandon raids, with limited success. The Lakandon Chʼol traded with the colonial Maya towns of Cobán and Cahabón in Alta Verapaz, receiving quetzal feathers, copal, chile, cotton, salt and Spanish-produced iron tools in exchange for cacao and achiote. From time to time the Spanish launched punitive military expeditions against the Lakandons to try to stabilise the northern frontier of the Guatemalan colony; the largest expeditions took place in 1685 and 1695.

Conversion and resettlement

Franciscan friars Antonio Margil and Melchor López were active among the Lakandon and Manche Chʼol between 1692 and 1694; they eventually outstayed their welcome and were expelled by the Chʼol. Most of the Lakandon Chʼol were forcibly relocated to the Huehuetenango area by the Spanish in the early 18th century. The resettled Lakandon Chʼol were soon absorbed into the local Maya populations there and ceased to exist as a separate ethnicity. The last known Lakandon Chʼol were three Indians that were recorded as living in Santa Catarina Retalhuleu in 1769.

See also

Acala Chʼol
Amerindian
Indigenous peoples of the Americas
Genetic history of indigenous peoples of the Americas

Notes

References

 

Maya peoples
History of Chiapas
History of Guatemala
Former indigenous peoples in Guatemala
Maya Contact Period